is a Japanese politician of the Constitutional Democratic Party and a member of the House of Councillors in the Diet (national legislature). A native of Tokushima Prefecture, she graduated from Doshisha University in 1999 and joined NTT upon graduation. She also studied at the graduate school of Doshisha University from 2001 until 2003 while still in the company. Leaving the company in July 2006, she was elected to the House of Councillors for the first time in 2007.

References

External links 
 Official website in Japanese.

Members of the House of Councillors (Japan)
Female members of the House of Councillors (Japan)
Doshisha University alumni
People from Tokushima Prefecture
1976 births
Living people
Constitutional Democratic Party of Japan politicians
Democratic Party of Japan politicians
21st-century Japanese women politicians
21st-century Japanese politicians